The 1971–72 Algerian Championnat National was the tenth season of the Algerian Championnat National since its establishment in 1962. A total of 16 teams contested the league, with MC Oran as the defending champions, The Championnat started on September 5, 1971 and ended on June 18, 1972.

Team summaries

Promotion and relegation 
Teams promoted from Algerian Division 2 1971–1972 
 USM Blida
 GC Mascara
 JS Djijel

Teams relegated to Algerian Division 2 1972–1973
 WA Tlemcen
 USM Alger
 ES Guelma

League table

Season statistics

Top scorers

References

External links
1971–72 Algerian Championnat National

Algerian Ligue Professionnelle 1 seasons
1971–72 in Algerian football
Algeria